The 9th Legislative Assembly of Quebec was the provincial legislature in Quebec, Canada that existed from May 11, 1897, to December 7, 1900. The Quebec Liberal Party led by Félix-Gabriel Marchand was the governing party. The Liberals would hold on to power until 1936.

Seats per political party

 After the 1897 elections

Member list

This was the list of members of the Legislative Assembly of Quebec that were elected in the 1897 election:

Other elected MLAs

Other MLAs were elected during this term in by-elections.

 Victor Gladu, Quebec Liberal Party, Yamaska, November 16, 1897 
 William Henry Clapperton, Quebec Liberal Party, Bonaventure, December 22, 1897 
 Nazaire-Nicolas Olivier, Quebec Liberal Party, Lévis, December 22, 1897 
 Cedric Lemoine Cotton, Quebec Liberal Party, Missisquoi, December 19, 1898 
 Donat Caron, Quebec Liberal Party, Matane, January 11, 1899

Cabinet Ministers

 Prime Minister and Executive Council President: Félix-Gabriel Marchand
 Agriculture: François-Gilbert Miville Dechêne
 Colonization and Mines: Adélard Turgeon
 Public Works: Henri Thomas Duffy
 Crown Lands: Guillaume-Alphonse Nantel (1896-1897)
 Lands, Forests and Fishing: Simon-Napoléon Parent
 Attorney General:Horace Archambault
 Provincial secretary: Felix-Gabriel Marchand (1897), Joseph-Émery Robidoux (1897-1900)
 Treasurer: Félix-Gabriel Marchand
 Members without portfolios, George Washington Stephens, Joseph Shehyn, James John Guerin

References
 1897 election results
 List of historical Cabinet ministers

009